Konrad Theodor Preuss (June 2, 1869 – June 8, 1938) was a German ethnologist. He was chairman of the Lithuanian Literary Society (1890–98).

Preuss was born in Preußisch-Eylau. After studying at the Albertina in Königsberg in Prussia and at Frederick William's University of Berlin he joined the Ethnological Museum of Berlin in 1895, advancing to director of the Central and North American department in 1920, before retiring in 1934. He also became a member of the faculty of the University of Berlin (1948 renamed as Humboldt University) and died in Berlin.

He became foreign member of the Royal Netherlands Academy of Arts and Sciences in 1928.

Works 
 Die geistige Kultur der Naturvölker. Leipzig, 1914
 Grammatik der Cora-Sprache, Columbia, New York 1932

References

External links
 

1869 births
1938 deaths
People from Bagrationovsk
University of Königsberg alumni
Humboldt University of Berlin alumni
German ethnologists
Pre-Columbian scholars
German Mesoamericanists
Academic staff of the Humboldt University of Berlin
Members of the Finnish Academy of Science and Letters
Members of the Royal Netherlands Academy of Arts and Sciences
Mesoamerican anthropologists
People from the Province of Prussia
20th-century Mesoamericanists
Linguists of Uto-Aztecan languages